Ram Nagarkar  (died 1995) was a noted Marathi actor and a stand up comedian. His stage show Vicha maji poori kara was the Guinness record holder of nine straight Golden Jubilee awards in a row, for Dada Kondke. His solo stand up show and his autobiography (Ram Nagari) was a tremendous hit. 

Marathi actors
1995 deaths
Year of birth missing